Action! Drama! Suspense! is the second full-length album from Syracuse, NY pop-punk band, Honor Bright. This is their first album on Triple Crown Records, and was released on July 20, 2010.  The album was produced by Tom Denney, formerly of A Day To Remember, and Jason Lancaster, of Go Radio and formerly of Mayday Parade.

Track listing
 "How to Break a Heart" – 3:16
 "Sleepless in Syracuse" – 3:26
 "Paper Thin Walls" – 3:19
 "Off Limits" – 3:51
 "Welcome to New York, Now Get a Job" – 2:56
 "There's a Lesson to be Learned Here" – 3:08
 "Stay Gold, Dennis Hoffman, Stay Gold" – 3:29
 "Hush Symphony" – 3:15
 "Don't Tell Mama" – 3:02
 "Hold Fast" – 2:51
 "Bednotch and Boomsticks"  – 3:27
"Bednotch and Boomsticks" includes a hidden bonus track titled "Cause in All the Candles" – 2:36

References

External links

Action! Drama! Suspense! at Bandcamp (streamed copy where licensed)

2010 albums
Albums produced by Tom Denney
Triple Crown Records albums
Honor Bright albums